Kalateh-ye Hoseynabad may refer to:
 Kalateh-ye Hoseynabad, Gonabad
 Kalateh-ye Hoseynabad, Mashhad